The Synagogue of Caen is a French synagogue located at 46 Avenue de la Libération, in Caen, Calvados, Normandy. The president of the Israelite Cultural Association of Caen (ACI), who own the building, is Nassim Levy.

History 
Before the construction of the synagogue, Jews in Caen held services in different locations around the city, notably in community buildings or the musée Langlois. With the arrival of North African Jews in France following the Indépendance of Algeria, the local Jewish community, largely composed of Ashkenazi Jews, recognized the need for the construction of a dedicated place of worship.

The site chosen for the new synagogue was formerly a garage owned by a Jewish man deported during the  Second World War. Seventy-five percent of the construction costs were covered by the American Jewish Joint Distribution Committee, at the time about 20 million francs. The architect was Guy Morizet. The first stone was laid on April 30, 1964 and construction lasted a month. The synagogue was consecrated on May 23, 1966 in the presence of Jacob Kaplan, Chief Rabbi of France.

Since the year 2000 
In 2006, anti-semitic leaflets were found near the entrance of the synagogue, making references to the Shoah.

As of 2020, the community has about 150 families.

In 2020, the synagogue began major renovations.

References 

Religious buildings and structures completed in 1966
Buildings and structures in Caen
Synagogues in France